Go-op may refer to:
 Go-Op (car sharing company), in Pittsburgh, US
 Go-Op (train operating company), in Bristol, UK

See also
 Goop (disambiguation)